Tara Duncan (also known as Tara Duncan: The Evil Empress in the United States, which is the title of the eighth novel) is an animated television series co-produced by MoonScoop Group and DQ Entertainment, with the participation of M6 and Disney Channel, very loosely based on the novel series. The show premiered on 27 June 2010 in France on Disney XD, and aired through 19 June 2011 but was cancelled after its twenty-sixth episode, much to the disappointment of fans. A computer-animated show started airing in August 2022, which follows the book series more.

Characters

Main
 Tara Duncan is the main character of the series. She's a confident seventeen-year-old (twelve in the book series) highest spellbinder-in-training, and commander of the Alpha Team. She has blue eyes and blond hair with a pale highlight, and her familiar is a pegasus named Gallant. She is very powerful magically as, according to Sparrow in "BFF", she can cause a whole lot of damage with her exceptionally strong powers alone. She tried to ask Master Chem what he knows about her deceased high spellbinder mother, but never gets the chance, even though Sparrow assured her she could ask another time.  
 Princess Gloria Daaval is Tara's best friend and animal-loving teammate on the Alpha Team. She is dating a local nonspell blonde-haired named Edward. She has brown waist-length wavy hair and eyes. Her familiar is a white panther named Sheeba. Her human name/nickname is "Sparrow" to conceal her true identity as both a princess from another world and her bestial curse to turn into a horned, fanged monster whenever she is furious, saddened or scared.  
 Caliban "Cal" Dal Salan is the final member of the Alpha Team. He was born to a family of master thieves and outlaws. He owns a video store and is super flirtatious. He has spiky black hair and gray eyes. His familiar is a red fox named Blondin.
 Isabella Duncan is Tara's strict maternal grandmother, who had raised her for the first seventeen years of her life since her parents demise. She is very passionate about Tara focusing on school and studying her spellbinding, and she has a weird romantic relationship with Tara's literature professor, Mr. Clarence Spade. She has a first cousin named Gabriella who runs a magic shop for advanced mystical artifacts and large or small spellbooks for both low-level, upper-level and topmost-level spellbinders.

Recurring
 Master Chem is the leader and assistant to the Alpha and Beta teams. His full name is Chemnashaovirodaintrachivu and he is the Guardian of the Transit Portals between Earth and Otherworld.
 Manitou Duncan is Tara's maternal great-grandfather who accidentally turned himself into a brown dog permanently; whereas the books, he is immortal but cursed to be trapped in the form of a brown Labrador retriever that has gradually stripped him of his humanity until a spell gives him human speech. 
 Robin M'angil is the commander of the Beta Team. He's a half-elf and likes to use an enchanted bow and arrow along with his magic.
 Fabrice Besois-Giron is the half-wolf member of the Beta Team. He and Tara refer to each other as brother and sister and he's very close with his team members.
 Fafnir Forgeafeux is the dwarf member of the Beta Team. She's very hotheaded and hates using magic, which leads to her getting into arguments with her teammates often.
 Sandra Leylocke is a Nonspell that goes to school with Tara. Despite considering themselves enemies, Tara and Sandra spend a lot of time together.
 Olivia "Livia" is a nonspell and Sandra's "best friend" and flunky. She's a petite blonde with big glasses who has a major crush on Cal, completely unaware of his magical abilities and being from Otherworld.
 Edward is a nonspell that loves horror movies and werewolves. He and Sparrow are dating on-and-off throughout the season.
 Jeremy and Jordon Cryista are two brown-skinned fraternal twin nonspells (human beings, mortals) at Tara's high school. People often refer to them as "the Twins" instead of by their first names since it easier. 
 Henry Delachasse is a nonspell villain who is a cryptologist bent on capturing some sort of otherworldly creature and revealing their existence to humanity.

Supporting
 Selena Duncan was Tara's late mother, a top-level spellbinder who was Isabella's only child, and Manitu's late granddaughter. She had met a sudden unfortunate demise when her only child Tara was just two years old. Like her daughter, she had shoulder-length blond hair with a beige streak in it, much unlike her in the books. A picture of her is seen in Tara's room"BFF", with which she asked for guidance as to why she was so mean all of a sudden. According to Serena the Vampire, she was very powerful as she was capable of stopping her from invading Earth many years ago single-handedly. Tara had tried to ask Master Chem what he knew of her mother, but Sparrow assured her she could another time; contrary to the novels, in which she is alive and rescued from her decade imprisonment in Magister's lair, at the end of Tara Duncan and the Spellbinders. She is a supporting character throughout the novels, but is ultimately killed, leaving Tara an orphan once again. 
 Clara "Claire" was an old classmate of Caliban's during his preteen years at Thief School on Otherworld about a decade ago. She was depicted as a nerdy misfit who was not really good at learning magic or thievery; because of these accusations she dropped out and changed her name to "Claire" to conceal herself from further bullying. Her familiar is a white owl. Debuting in "Clairvoyant" (as a play on her new name), she had taken advantage of Tara's trust and friendship to steal for a pack of master thieves as her initiation into their group.
 Gabriela Duncan is Isabella's first cousin who currently runs a magic store full of various mystical artifacts, charms, talismans and spellbooks for spellbinders of all power levels as mentioned in "Summer School." Isabella had wanted to send Tara to her for further training in perfecting her ever developing and increasingly powerful abilities.

Episodes

Broadcast
The show premiered on 12 February 2011 in the United States, and was cancelled on 10 December 2011.

References

External links
 

2010s French animated television series
2010 French television series debuts
French children's animated adventure television series
French children's animated drama television series
French children's animated fantasy television series
Anime-influenced Western animated television series
Teen animated television series